Yewta is a small village within Kaij tehsil, Beed district, Maharashtra, India. It was very neatly planned, quite village situated within hilly parts. It has various temples like Vithal Rukhmini, Yewteshwar (Shankar), Balaji, Maruti Par, Munjya, Khandoba, Janai Devi, Narsoba, Jotiba.

A dam was constructed during 1970-1972 for the purpose of rain water storage.  Farming is the most likely profession of the people out there.  Various other professions exist as well (12 Balutedar).
A name Yewta is due to the temple of lord Yewteshwara situated in the village.
In the village there is old Zila parishad high school (Govt School) up to 10th standard. 
It is one of the oldest Zila parishad high school in the beed district.

Villages in Beed district